Mushie Airport  is an airport serving the town of Mushie in Democratic Republic of the Congo.

See also

Transport in the Democratic Republic of the Congo
List of airports in the Democratic Republic of the Congo

References

External links
 OpenStreetMap - Mushie Airport
 OurAirports - Mushie
 Mushie
 HERE Maps - Mushie
 

Airports in Mai-Ndombe Province